Pasha Kola (also Romanized as Pāshā Kolā) is a village in Balatajan Rural District, in the Central District of Qaem Shahr County, Mazandaran Province, Iran. At the 2006 census, its population was 320, in 81 families.

References 

Populated places in Qaem Shahr County